James Loveridge (born 16 May 1994) is a Welsh footballer who plays as a forward for Welsh Premier League club Llanelli Town.

Club career

Swansea City
In 2010, Loveridge joined the youth academy of Swansea City. During his youth years, Loveridge scored goals against Liverpool, Portsmouth and Manchester United in the FA Youth Cup. In May 2012, Loveridge was offered his first professional contract with Swansea City. On 19 April 2013, Loveridge signed a new one-year contract with Swansea, keeping him at the club until June 2014. After a loan spell at Milton Keynes Dons, Loveridge was rewarded with a new one-year contract with Swansea until June 2015.

Milton Keynes Dons (loan)
In March 2014, Loveridge was loaned to Milton Keynes Dons of League One for one month. Manager Karl Robinson commented "He's quick, he's a good size and I like the fact he's grounded in the Swansea way. He can play anywhere across the top three but wants to be a number nine." Loveridge made his debut for the club against Stevenage coming as a 46th-minute substitute for Izale McLeod. Loveridge's loan was subsequently extended for the final two games of the 2013–14 season.

Newport County (loan)
On 2 October 2014, Loveridge joined League Two club Newport County on an initial one-month loan that was subsequently extended. He made his debut for Newport on 4 October as a second-half substitute in the 1–0 defeat at Oxford United.

Port Talbot Town
Following his release from Swansea, Loveridge joined Welsh Premier League team Port Talbot Town.

Llanelli Town
In January 2017, Loveridge signed for Llanelli Town.

International career
Loveridge has represented Wales at both under-17 and under-19 level. On 15 March 2014, Loveridge received his first call-up for the Wales under-21 squad as a replacement for the injured Tom Lawrence.

Career statistics

References

External links
Swansea City profile

Soccerbase profile

1994 births
Living people
Association football forwards
Swansea City A.F.C. players
Milton Keynes Dons F.C. players
Newport County A.F.C. players
English Football League players
Footballers from Llanelli
Welsh footballers
Wales youth international footballers
Cymru Premier players